The 2018–19 Nemzeti Bajnokság I/A (in English: National Championship I/A) was the 88th season of the Nemzeti Bajnokság I/A, the highest professional basketball league in Hungary. Szolnoki Olaj was the defending champion.

The season ended on 21 June 2019, when Falco Vulcano won its second national championship after sweeping Egis Körmend in the finals.

Teams

The following 14 clubs compete in the NB I/A during the 2018–19 season. TF Budapest was promoted to this season as champions from the Hungarian 2018–19 NB I/B. MAFC left the league.

Arenas and locations

Personnel and kits

Regular season

League table

Results

Second round

1st – 5th Placement matches

Results

6th – 10th Placement matches

Results

11th – 14th Placement matches

Results

Playoffs
Teams in bold won the playoff series. Numbers to the left of each team indicate the team's original playoff seeding. Numbers to the right indicate the score of each playoff game.

Quarter-finals
In the quarterfinals, teams playing against each other had to win three games to win the series. Thus, if one team wins three games before all five games have been played, the games that remain are omitted. The team that finished in the higher regular season place, played the first, third and the fifth (if it was necessary) games of the series at home.

|}

Semi-finals
In the semifinals, teams playing against each other had to win three games to win the series. Thus, if one team wins three games before all five games have been played, the games that remain are omitted. The team that finished in the higher regular season place, played the first, third and the fifth (if it was necessary) games of the series at home.

|}

Finals
In the finals, teams playing against each other had to win three games to win the title. Thus, if one team won three games before all five games were played, the remaining games were omitted. The team that finished in the higher regular season place, played the first, the third, and the fifth (if it was necessary) games of the series at home.

|}

Game 1

Game 2

Game 3

Third place
In the series for the third place, teams playing against each other had to win two games to win the 3rd place in the final rankings of the season. Thus, if one team won two games before all three games had been played, the remaining games were omitted. The team that finished in the higher regular season place, played the first and the third (if it was necessary) games of the series at home.

|}

Playout
Higher ranked team hosted Game 1 plus Game 3 if necessary. The lower ranked hosted Game 2.

|}

Final standings

Season statistics

Individual statistics
As of 28 June 2019.

Points

Rebounds

Valuation

Assists

Number of teams by counties

Hungarian clubs in European competitions

Hungarian clubs in regional competitions

See also
 2019 Magyar Kupa

References

External links
 Hungarian Basketball Federaration 
 bb1.hu

Nemzeti Bajnoksag I/A (men's basketball) seasons
Hungarian
Nemzeti Bajnoksag Men